2020 Spanish regional elections may refer to:

2020 Basque regional election
2020 Galician regional election